The Act of Union 1707 and pre-Union Scottish legislation provided for 14 Members of Parliament (MPs) from Scotland to be elected from districts of burghs.  All the parliamentary burghs (burghs represented in the pre-Union Parliament of Scotland) were assigned to a district, except for Edinburgh which had an MP to itself. The burghs in a district were not necessarily adjacent or even close together.

Until 1832 the Council of each burgh in a district elected a commissioner, who had one vote for the MP. The commissioner from the Returning Burgh (which function rotated amongst the burghs in successive elections) had an additional casting vote if the numbers were equal.

The Scottish Reform Act 1832 amended the composition of the districts, and the boundaries of a burgh for parliamentary purposes ceased to be necessarily those of the burgh for other purposes. The franchise was extended, and votes from all the burghs were added together.

There were further changes to the number and the composition of the districts under the Representation of the People (Scotland) Act 1868, Redistribution of Seats Act 1885, and Representation of the People Act 1918.

The district of burghs system was eventually discontinued by the House of Commons (Redistribution of Seats) Act 1949, but the term Burghs continued in use in the names of some constituencies until 1974.

The idea of parliamentary burghs continues to this day, in the form of burgh constituencies, which are distinct from county constituencies. This distinction is significant in terms of the expenses allowed to election candidates.

List of districts and burghs

Summary of districts and burghs by period
1708-1832 (14 Districts) (65 Burghs)
 Aberdeen Burghs (5)
 Anstruther Easter Burghs (5)
 Ayr Burghs (5)
 Dumfries Burghs (5)
 Dysart Burghs (4)
 Elgin Burghs (5)
 Glasgow Burghs (4)
 Haddington Burghs (5)
 Inverness Burghs (4)
 Linlithgow Burghs (4)
 Perth Burghs (5)
 Stirling Burghs (5)
 Tain Burghs (5)
 Wigtown Burghs (4)
1832-1868 (14 Districts) (69 Burghs)
 Ayr Burghs (5)
 Dumfries Burghs (5)
 Elgin Burghs (6)
 Falkirk Burghs (5)
 Haddington Burghs (5)
 Inverness Burghs (4)
 Kilmarnock Burghs (5)
 Kirkcaldy Burghs (4)
 Leith Burghs (3)
 Montrose Burghs (5)
 St Andrews Burghs (7)
 Stirling Burghs (5)
 Wick Burghs (6)
 Wigtown Burghs (4)
1868-1885 (15 Districts) (72 Burghs)
 Ayr Burghs (5)
 Dumfries Burghs (5)
 Elgin Burghs (6)
 Falkirk Burghs (5)
 Haddington Burghs (5)
 Inverness Burghs (4)
 Hawick Burghs (3)
 Kilmarnock Burghs (5)
 Kirkcaldy Burghs (4)
 Leith Burghs (3)
 Montrose Burghs (5)
 St Andrews Burghs (7)
 Stirling Burghs (5)
 Wick Burghs (6)
 Wigtown Burghs (4)
1885-1918 (13 Districts) (62 Burghs)
 Ayr Burghs (5)
 Dumfries Burghs (5)
 Elgin Burghs (6)
 Falkirk Burghs (5)
 Hawick Burghs (3)
 Inverness Burghs (4)
 Kilmarnock Burghs (5)
 Kirkcaldy Burghs (4)
 Leith Burghs (3)
 Montrose Burghs (5)
 St Andrews Burghs (7)
 Stirling Burghs (5)
 Wick Burghs (6)
1918-1950 (6 Districts) (26 Burghs)
 Ayr Burghs (6)
 Dumbarton Burghs (2)
 Dunfermline Burghs (4)
 Kirkcaldy Burghs (6)
 Montrose Burghs (5)
 Stirling & Falkirk Burghs (3)

See also

 Burgh constituency
 List of burghs in Scotland

Notes and references